Garry W. Breitkreuz (pronounced Bright-Krites) (born October 21, 1945) is a Canadian politician. He was the Conservative Party of Canada member of the House of Commons of Canada for Yorkton—Melville from 1993 to 2015. He was formerly a member of the Reform Party of Canada (1993–2000) and the Canadian Alliance (2000–2003). While he had no formal position in the cabinet, as an Opposition member he was Deputy House Leader of the Opposition, Conservative Party Deputy House Leader, Deputy Whip of the Official Opposition, Chief Opposition Whip, and Critic to the Solicitor General.

Breitkreuz has been known to be the most outspoken member of the House of Commons on his opposition to the Canadian gun registry.

In 2005, Breitkreuz was granted the Sport Shooting Ambassador Award by the World Forum on the Future of Sport Shooting Activities.

Electoral record

External links
 
 How'd They Vote?: Garry Breitkreuz's voting history and quotes

1945 births
Canadian Alliance MPs
Canadian Baptists
Canadian people of German descent
Conservative Party of Canada MPs
Living people
Members of the House of Commons of Canada from Saskatchewan
People from Yorkton
Reform Party of Canada MPs
21st-century Canadian politicians